Doblemente embarazada is a 2021 Peruvian comedy film written and directed by Eduardo Mendoza de Echave. It is a remake of the 2019 Mexican film Doblemente embarazada. It stars Carolina Cano, Andrés Wiese, Nicolás Galindo and Daniela Camaiora.

Synopsis 
Cristina (Carolina Cano), a young girl about to marry Javier (Andrés Wiese). At her bachelorette party, she has an unexpected reunion with Felipe (Nicolás Galindo), her former love of all her life.

Cast 
The actors participating in this film are:

 Carolina Cano as Cristina
 Nicolas Galindo as Felipe
 Andrés Wiese as Javier
 Pablo Agüero as Nurse
 Daniela Camaiora as Catalina

Production 
The film begins filming at the end of 2019, in total there were 4 weeks of filming.

Release 
The film had planned to be released on April 9, 2020 in Peruvian theaters, but the premiere was canceled due to the closure of theaters due to the Covid-19 pandemic. The film premiered on September 30, 2021 in Peruvian theaters.

References

External links 

 

2021 films
2021 comedy films
Peruvian comedy films
Tondero Producciones films
2020s Peruvian films
2020s Spanish-language films
Films set in Peru
Films shot in Peru
Remakes of Mexican films
Films impacted by the COVID-19 pandemic